Neoeuxesta guamana is a species of ulidiid, or picture-winged fly, in the genus Neoeuxesta. It is found in Guam.

References

Ulidiidae
Insects described in 1952
Fauna of Guam